Colias chippewa, the heath sulphur, is a butterfly in the family Pieridae found in North America and northeastern Asia. Its range includes Alaska across northern Canada, including all the territories, and as far east as Labrador. and the Russian Far East.

Flight period is from mid-June until early August.

Wingspan is from 32 to 45 mm.

Larvae feed on Vaccinium uliginosum and Vaccinium caespitosum.

Habitat
Bogs and tundras.

Taxonomy
Colias chippewa may be a subspecies of Colias palaeno see Grieshuber & Lamas, 2007; however, C. chippewa is considered a separate species from C. palaeno by Guppy and Shepard (2001) on the basis of work by V. K. Tuzov (which they quote). He found that, in the Magadan region of Siberia, the two forms were sympatric but locally separated C. chippewa was restricted to stream-edges in dry tundra and C.palaeno was found only in low-elevation forested swamps.

Subspecies
Listed alphabetically.
C. c. baffinensis Ebner & Ferris, 1978 Baffin Island.
C. c. chippewa
C. c. gomojunovae Korshunov, 1996  Russian Far East  (Chukotka, Magadan)

References

External links

Colias chippewa, Rusinsects

chippewa
Butterflies of North America
Insects of the Arctic
Butterflies described in 1872
Butterflies of Asia
Taxa named by William Henry Edwards